This is a list of media serving the Omaha metropolitan area in Omaha, Nebraska and Council Bluffs, Iowa.

Radio
Start dates are for the frequency/station license, not for callsign or programming that may have moved from license to license.
Omaha radio stations gets 25 Analog FM stations, 10 Digital HD Radio FM stations including 8 subchannels Like HD-2 and HD-3, 11 Analog AM stations, and 1 Digital HD Radio AM Station affiliated KFAB.

AM

FM

Television

Print

The Omaha World-Herald, the Omaha Bee, and by 1900 the Omaha Daily News had developed into the city's most influential journals.

The African American community in Omaha has had several newspapers serve it. The first was the Progress, established in 1889 by Ferdinand L. Barnett. Cyrus D. Bell, an ex-slave, established the Afro-American Sentinel in 1892. In 1893 George F. Franklin started publishing the Enterprise, later published by Thomas P. Mahammitt. It was the longest lived of any of the early African American newspapers published in Omaha. The best known and most widely read of all African American newspapers in the city was the Omaha Monitor, established in 1915, edited and published by Reverend John Albert Williams. It stopped being published in 1929.  In 1906, Lucille Skaggs Edwards published, The Women's Aurora, making her the first black woman to publish a magazine in Nebraska.George Wells Parker, co-founder of the Hamitic League of the World, founded the New Era in Omaha from 1920 through until 1926. The Omaha Guide was established by B.V. and C.C. Galloway in 1927. The Guide, with a circulation of over twenty-five thousand and an advertisers' list including business firms from coast to coast, was the largest African American newspaper west of the Missouri River. The Omaha Star, founded by Mildred Brown, began publication in 1938, and continues today as the only African American newspaper in Omaha.

Current

Historic

References

External links 
 Silicon Prairie News
 Omaha.net - Local News and Stories
  - Local Commercial Printing and Digital Media in Omaha, Nebraska

Omaha
Mass media in Nebraska
Media